Emmanuel Asajile Mwambulukutu (22 November 1944 - August 2017) was a Tanzanian politician and diplomat. He was Tanzania's ambassador to South Africa until 2007 when he and his family were brutally  attacked.

Education 
He received his BA Hons (Education) from University of Dar es Salaam in 1968, followed by B Phil (Economic Development) from University of Dar es Salaam in 1969.
In 1982 he received his post graduate degree from the Woodrow Wilson School of Public and International Affairs at Princeton University, New Jersey, USA.

Prior to attending college, Mwambulukutu also attended:
Mabonde Primary School (1957),
Ndembela Middle School (1961),
Mkwawa Secondary School (O' Levels) (1964), and
Malangali High School (A' Levels) (1965).

Career 

After serving as a civil servant for over ten years under the government of Julius Kambarage Nyerere (the first president of Tanzania), Ambassador Mwambulukutu was awarded a scholarship to undertake further post graduate studies at Princeton University (1981–1982). He is also a Parvin Fellow, Woodrow Wilson School of Public and International Affairs, Princeton University, New Jersey, USA.

Experience in civil service:
 Teacher - A Levels, Shinyanga (Shycom) and Tabora Boys (1968–1970)
 Academic Officer Headquarters, Ministry of Education, Dar es Salaam (1970–1971)
 District Development Director (DDD), Same Kilimanjaro (1972–1975)
 Director of Village Management Programme, Office of the Prime Minister Tanzania (1975–1976)
 Director of Manpower and Administration, Office of the President, Tanzania (1976–1978)
 Regional Development Director (RDD) Kigoma (1978–1981)
 Regional Development Director (RDD) Arusha (1981–1984)
 Regional Development Director (RDD) Ruvuma (1984–1985)
 Chairman of Regional Trading Companies (RTC) for Kigoma, Arusha and Ruvuma (1978–1985)

Experience in politics:
 Deputy Minister, Local government, community development, cooperatives and marketing (1988–1990)
 Deputy Minister, Regional Administration and Local government (1990–1993)
 Deputy Minister, Land, housing and urban development (1993–1995)
 Deputy Minister, Home affairs (1995–1997)

Experience within Tanganyika African National Union and Chama cha Mapinduzi:
 Assistant Secretary, Political Education, TANU Headquarters, Lumumba, Dar es Salaam (1971–1972)
 Member of Parliament (CCM), Rungwe (1985–1995); Rungwe East (1995–2000)
 Member of the CCM National Executive Committee (NEC) (1997–2002)
 UVCCM Commander, Rungwe District (1993–2000)

Experience in diplomacy and international affairs:
 Deputy Minister, Foreign Affairs and international cooperation (1991–1993)
 Deputy Minister, Foreign Affairs and international cooperation (1997–1999)
 High Commissioner of Tanzania to South Africa (December 1999 - June 2008)

Ambassador Mwambulukutu in the media

On 30 December 2007 four assailants attacked and robbed his family, stabbing his wife and other guests with bottles, and he was put into intensive care.

Following the attack that left him with severe injuries, in late January 2008 it was revealed in the Tanzania's media that Ambassador Mwambulukutuwas still in ICU but his life was out of danger ippmedia)
According to latest reports from various media in Tanzania, Ambassador Mwambulukutu is already back in Tanzania after his tenure as Tanzanian Ambassador to South Africa ended.  It is widely expected that Ambassador Mwambulukutu will be appointed to another important post in President Jakaya Kikwete's government based on good ties that the Ambassador has had with the country's top leadership since the era of Julius Nyerere.

References

External links
 Foreign representatives in the republic of South Africa website
 Ambassador Mwambulukutu's welcome message website
 US Department of State archive website
 University of Pennsylvania archive website
  website

1944 births
Living people
Members of the National Assembly (Tanzania)
Princeton School of Public and International Affairs alumni
High Commissioners of Tanzania to South Africa
Tanzanian victims of crime